Bagration may refer to:
 Bagrationi dynasty, Georgian royal dynasty; see for other members of the dynasty
 Prince Pyotr Bagration (1765–1812), Russian general of Georgian royal origin
 Operation Bagration, a major offensive operation of the Soviet Army in 1944 named after Pyotr Bagration
 Bagrationovskaya, Moscow metro station named after Pyotr Bagration
 Bagrationovsk, town named after Pyotr Bagration
 Bagration flèches, historic military earthworks named after Pyotr Bagration
 Bagration Bridge, bridge in Moscow named after Pyotr Bagration
 3127 Bagration, asteroid named after Pyotr Bagration
 Princess Catherine Bagration (1783–1857), wife of Pyotr